Les Arques is a commune in the Lot department in southwestern France.

Population

See also
Communes of the Lot department

References

External links
 Official website

Communes of Lot (department)